Karamat Ali (born 18 March 1996) is a Pakistani first-class cricketer.

References

External links
 

1996 births
Living people
Pakistani cricketers
Place of birth missing (living people)
United Bank Limited cricketers